Marlo is an unincorporated community in Ste. Genevieve County, in the U.S. state of Missouri.

The community's name most likely is partially derived from marble, since there were deposits of marble near the original town site.

References

Unincorporated communities in Ste. Genevieve County, Missouri
Unincorporated communities in Missouri